Senator Barclay may refer to:

H. Douglas Barclay (born 1932), New York State Senate
John Barclay (mayor) (1749–1824), Pennsylvania State Senate
William Barclay (Northern Ireland politician) (1873/1874–1945), Northern Irish Senate

See also
Senator Barkley (disambiguation)